Shudra is the laborer and service caste in the Hindu varna system. ( 1, Brahmana, 2,Kshathriya,3, Vaisya, 4, Shudra)

Shudra may also refer to:

 Shudra: The Rising, a 2012 film
 Ron Shudra (born 1967), former ice-hockey player
 Dalit, a group of castes in Hinduism